The Montefiore Institute is the department of Electrical Engineering and Computer Science of the Faculty of Applied Sciences of the University of Liège, Belgium.

It was founded in 1883 and is named after Georges Montefiore-Levi.

External links
Montefiore Institute website

University of Liège
Electrical and computer engineering departments